Dalmatia was a Roman province. Its name is derived from the name of an Illyrian tribe called the Dalmatae, which lived in the central area of the eastern coast of the Adriatic Sea. It encompassed the northern part of present-day Albania, much of Croatia, Bosnia and Herzegovina, Montenegro, Kosovo and Serbia, thus covering an area significantly larger than the current Croatian region of Dalmatia. Originally this region was called Illyria (in Greek) or Illyricum (in Latin).

The province of Illyricum was dissolved and replaced by two separate provinces: Dalmatia and Pannonia.

Conquest
The region which ran along the coast of the Adriatic Sea and extended inland on the Dinaric Alps was called Illyria by the Greeks. Originally, the Romans also called the area Illyria and later, Illyricum. The Romans fought three Illyrian Wars (229 BC, 219/8 BC and 168 BC) mainly against the kingdom of the Ardiaei to the south of the region. In 168 BC, they abolished this kingdom and divided it into three republics. The area became a Roman protectorate. The central and northern area of the region engaged in piracy and raided north-eastern Italy. In response, Octavian (who later became the emperor Augustus) conducted a series of campaigns in Illyricum (35–33 BC). The area became the Roman senatorial province of Illyricum probably in 27 BC. Due to troubles in the northern part of the region in 16–10 BC, it became an imperial province. The administrative organisation of Illyricum was carried out late in the reign of Augustus (27 BC – 14 AD) and early in the reign of Tiberius (14–37 AD).

Part of Illyricum
Due to Octavian having subdued the more inland region of Pannonia (along the mid-course of the River Danube), the Romans changed the name of the coastal area to Dalmatia. The earliest writing which indicates that the province of Illyricum comprised Dalmatia and Pannonia is the mention by Velleius Paterculus of Gaius Vibius Postumus as the military commander of Dalmatia under Germanicus in 9 AD, towards the end of the Batonian War. In 6–9 AD, there was a large scale rebellion in the province of Illyricum, the Bellum Batonianum (Batonian War).

The province of Illyricum was eventually dissolved and replaced by two smaller provinces: Dalmatia (the southern area) and Pannonia (the northern and Danubian area). It is unclear when this happened. Kovác noted that an inscription on the base of a statue of Nero erected between 54 and 68 AD attests that it was erected by the veteran of a legion stationed in Pannonia and argues that this is the first epigraphic evidence that a separate Pannonia existed at least since the reign of Nero. However, Šašel-Kos notes that an inscription attests a governor of Illyricum under the reign of Claudius (41–54 AD) and in a military diploma published in the late 1990s, dated July 61 AD, units of auxiliaries from the Pannonian part of the province were mentioned as being stationed in Illyricum. Some other diplomas attest the same. This was during the reign of Nero (54–68 AD). Therefore, Šašel-Kos supports the notion that the province was dissolved during the reign of Vespasian (69–79 AD).

Administrative changes

In 337, when Constantine the Great died, the Roman Empire was partitioned among his sons. The empire was divided into three praetorian prefectures: the Galliae; Italia, Africa et Illyricum; and Oriens. The size of the provinces had been decreased and their number doubled by Diocletian. The provinces were also grouped in dioceses. Dalmatia became one of the seven provinces of the diocese of Pannonia. Initially, it was under the praetorian prefecture of Italy, Africa and Illyricum. It seems that the three dioceses of Macedonia, Dacia and Pannonia were first grouped together in a separate praetorian prefecture in 347 by Constans by removing them from the praetorian prefecture of Italy, Africa and Illyricum (which then became the praetorian prefecture of Italy and Africa) or that this praetorian prefecture was formed in 343 when Constans appointed a prefect for Italy.

Romanization
German historian Theodor Mommsen wrote (in his The Provinces of the Roman Empire) that coastal Dalmatia and its islands were fully romanized and Latin-speaking by the 4th century.

The Croatian historian Aleksandar Stipčević writes that analysis of archaeological material from that period has shown that the process of romanization was rather selective. While urban centers, both coastal and inland, were almost completely romanized, the situation in the countryside was completely different. Despite the Illyrians being subject to a strong process of acculturation, they continued to speak their native language (Illyrian language), worship their own gods and traditions, and follow their own social-political tribal organization which was adapted to Roman administration and political structure only in some necessities.

Collapse

In 454 Marcellinus, a military commander in Dalmatia, rebelled against Valentinian III, the Roman emperor in the West. He seized control of Dalmatia and governed it independently until his death in 468. Julius Nepos became the governor of Dalmatia even though he was a relative of the emperor of the East, Leo I the Thracian, and Dalmatia was under the western part of the Roman empire. Dalmatia remained an autonomous area. In 474, Leo I elevated Nepos as emperor of the western part of the empire in order to depose Glycerius, a usurper emperor. Nepos deposed the usurper, but was in turn deposed in 475 by Orestes, who made his son Romulus Augustus emperor in the west. Leo I refused to recognise him and still held Julius Nepos as the emperor of the west. Romulus Augustus was deposed in 476  by Odoacer, who proclaimed himself king of Italy. Nepos remained in Dalmatia and continued to govern it until he was assassinated in 480. Ovida, a military commander, was in charge of Dalmatia thereafter. However, Odoacer used Nepos' murder as a pretext to invade Dalmatia, defeated Ovida and annexed Dalmatia to his kingdom of Italy. In  488 Zeno, the new emperor of the east, sent Theodoric the Great, the king of the Ostrogoths, to Italy so as to depose Odoacer. Zeno also wanted to get rid of the Ostrogoths, who were Roman allies and were settled in the eastern part of the empire, but were becoming restless and difficult to manage. Theodoric fought a four-year war in Italy, killed Odoacer, settled his people in Italy and established the Ostrogothic Kingdom there. Dalmatia and the rest of the former diocese of Pannonia came under the Ostrogothic Kingdom.

List of governors of Dalmatia 
 Publius Silius, son of Publius: between 19 and 16 BC
 Gaius Vibius Postumus: c.9 or 10 AD, first governor
 Marcus Servilius, son of Gaius, probably before 14 AD 
 Publius Cornelius Dolabella: 14–20
 Lucius Volusius Saturninus: 20–37
 Lucius Arruntius Camillus Scribonianus: c. AD 41
 Gaius Calpetanus Rantius Sedatus: c. AD 48
 Aulus Ducenius Geminus: AD 67/68 or before
 Marcus Pompeius Silvanus Staberius Flavinus: 67/68—70
 Lucius Plotius Pegasus: 70/71–72/73
 Lucius Funisulanus Vettonianus: 79/80–81/82
 Gaius Cilnius Proculus: between 87 and 97
 Quintus Pomponius Rufus: 92/93–94/95
 Macer: 98/99–99/100
 Gaius Minicius Fundanus: after 107, probably 108/109–111/112
 Publius Coelius Balbinus Vibullius Pius: after 137
 Marcus Aemilius Papus: 147—150
 Titus Prifernius Paetus Rosianus Geminus: 153–156
 Sextus Aemilius Equester: 159–162
 Publius Julius Scapula Tertullus: 164–169
 Pollienus Auspex: c. 173–175
 Marcus Didius Iulianus: c. 175–177
 Gaius Vettius Sabinianus Julius Hospes: c. 177–178
 Gaius Arrius Antoninus: c. 178–179
 Lucius Aurelius Gallus: c. 179–182
 Lucius Junius Rufinus Proculianus: c. 182–184
 Marcus Cassius Apronianus: after 185
 Marcus Nummius Umbrius Primus Senecio Albinus: 212–214
 Gaius Avitus Alexianus: c. 214–216
 Lucius Cassius Dio Cocceianus: c. 223–225
 Gaius Fulvius Maximus: between 222 and 235
 Lucius Domitius Gallicanus Papinianus: c. 238

Independent rulers in the 5th century 
 Marcellinus: 454–468
 Julius Nepos: 468–480
 Ovida: 480–481/482

Notes

Bibliography 

 Appian, the Foreign Wars, The Illyrian wars,   Book 10, The Illyirian Wars; Loeb Classical Library, Vol II, Books 8.2-12, Harvard University Press, 1912;  
 Barnes, T., The New Empire of Diocletian and Constantine, Harvard University Press, 1982; 
 Barnes, T., Constantine: Dynasty, Religion and Power in the Later Roman Empire (Blackwell Ancient Lives), Wiley-Blackwell, reprint edition, 2013; 
 Cassius Dio, Roman History, Vol 6, Books 51-65 (Loeb Classical Library), Loeb, 1989;  
 MacGeorge, P., Late Roman Warlords. Oxford University Press, 2002; .
 
 
 Notitia Dignitarum, BiblioLife, 2009;

Sources and external links 
Map
Map

27 BC establishments
480 disestablishments
States and territories disestablished in the 5th century
 
Roman Balkans
Romanization of Southeastern Europe
Croatia in the Roman era
Serbia in the Roman era
States and territories established in the 1st century BC
20s BC establishments in the Roman Empire
480s disestablishments in the Roman Empire
History of Dalmatia